Ahmet Taner Kışlalı (10 July 1939 – 21 October 1999) was a Turkish intellectual, political scientist, lawyer, commentator/author for the Cumhuriyet newspaper, academics and politician.

Biography
He completed his primary and secondary education in Kilis, and graduated from "Kabataş Erkek Lisesi" high school in Istanbul in 1957.

He received a degree from the School of Political Sciences at Ankara University, in 1963. During his college years, he also worked in the newspaper "Yeni Gün", published in Ankara. He got his PhD on "Çağdaş Türkiye'de Siyasal Güçler" (Political Powers in Contemporary Turkey) from the University of Paris, Department of Constitutional Law and Political Science. He started his academic life as a lecturer in Hacettepe Üniversitesi, Ankara. He then moved to School of Political Sciences at Ankara University and became an assistant professor, and later an associate professor in 1977.

In 1977 he was elected to the Turkish parliament, Grand National Assembly of Turkey, as deputy of İzmir. Between the years 1978 and 1979, he was appointed to position of ministry of culture, by prime minister Bülent Ecevit. During his term of ministry, he restarted the effort of printing classical works by the state press, making these available to masses at reasonable prices.

After the military coup of 12 September 1980, Ahmet Taner Kışlalı went back to the academia, and became a full professor in 1988. He continued to give lectures on political science in Department of Communication at Ankara University, after his retirement. Starting from 1991, he had a regular column in the leftist newspaper Cumhuriyet  with the title "Haftaya Bakış" ("A View of the Week").

Assassination
On 21 October 1999, shortly after having faxed his article to the newly Cumhuriyet at 9:40 h local time, Ahmet Taner Kışlalı left his home and headed for his car. As he got in the car, he noticed a package placed at the windshield wiper. He picked it up with his left arm, and at that moment an explosion occurred tearing off his left arm at elbow. His wristwatch penetrated into his head together with bomb shrapnel. His wife Nilüfer Kışlalı arranged for his immediate delivery to a hospital, where however his death only was ascertained.

After memorial services held at the Turkish Grand National Assembly, Faculty of Communications in Ankara University, Grand Theatre of Ankara Opera House, Ankara Office of Cumhuriyet newspaper, and religious funeral service at Kocatepe Mosque, he was laid to rest at Karşıyaka Cemetery in Ankara.

See also
 List of assassinated people from Turkey

References

External links 
 Who is who entry page in belgenet 
  
 

20th-century Turkish journalists
21st-century Turkish journalists
1939 births
1999 deaths
Turkish non-fiction writers
Turkish scientists
Turkish political scientists
People from Tokat
Ankara University Faculty of Political Sciences alumni
Academic staff of Hacettepe University
Academic staff of Ankara University
Murdered Cumhuriyet columnists
Government ministers of Turkey
Assassinated Turkish politicians
Assassinated Turkish journalists
Deaths by car bomb in Turkey
Turkish terrorism victims
Terrorism deaths in Turkey
People murdered in Turkey
Kabataş Erkek Lisesi alumni
Ministers of Culture of Turkey
Cumhuriyet people
Journalists killed in Turkey
Deputies of Izmir
Burials at Karşıyaka Cemetery, Ankara
1999 murders in Turkey
20th-century political scientists